Brianda Domecq (born New York City, August 1, 1942) is a Spanish-Mexican novelist. She was born to a Spanish father (Pedro Domecq González) and American mother (Elizabeth Cook), and learned Spanish as a child when her family moved to Mexico for business. She currently resides in Europe.

Works
Once días y algo más 1979
Bestiario Doméstico 1982
Voces y rostros del Bravo 1988
Acechando Al Unicorno (Stalking the Unicorn): La Virginidad En La Literatura Mexicana (Virginity in Mexican Literature  1988 
La insólita historia de la Santa de Cabora 1990
BD/De cuerpo entero 1991
Mujer que publica, mujer pública 1994 
A través de los ojos de ella (dos tomos) 1999
Un día fui caballo 2000
Once dias... y algo mas, English edition Eleven Days - autobiographical account of a kidnapping 1995

References

Aurora M. Ocampo (dir.), Diccionario de escritores mexicanos. Siglo XX: desde las generaciones del Ateneo y novelistas de la Revolución hasta nuestros días.Vol. II, pp. 46-49

1942 births
Living people
Writers from New York City